Puerto Nuevo may refer to:

Places
Argentina
Puerto Nuevo, Argentina

Chile
Puerto Nuevo, Chile

Mexico
Puerto Nuevo, Baja California

US
Puerto Nuevo (Hato Rey), Puerto Rico

Other uses
Club Atlético Puerto Nuevo, an Argentinian football club
Puerto nuevo (film), a 1936 Argentine musical film